ADINA Watches is an Australian manufacturer of Clocks and watches.

History
ADINA was founded in Woolloongabba in 1971 before moving to the Brisbane CBD for a 6-year stint before returning to Woolloongabba and purchasing 11 Holden Street, which was to be their base for the next 30 years.

Factory
After almost being flooded in 2001 the decision was taken to purchase 209 Logan Rd Woolloongabba and make Adina's first custom-built factory equipped with two state-of-the-art workshops. One for production, the other for after sales service, making it one of the oldest family-owned watch companies in Australia.

References

External links

Designer Watch
Automatic Watch

Watch brands
Australian brands
Watch manufacturing companies
Manufacturing companies based in Brisbane
Privately held companies of Australia
Australian companies established in 1971
Manufacturing companies established in 1971
Clock manufacturing companies of Australia
Watch manufacturing companies of Australia